D42, D-42 or D.42 may refer to:

 Arm, cubit symbol (hieroglyph)
 D42 road (Croatia)
 , a Fletcher-class destroyer of the Greek Navy
 , a C-class light cruiser of the Royal Navy
 , a Ruler-class escort carrier of the Royal Navy
 , a W-class destroyer of the Royal Navy
 Springfield Municipal Airport (Minnesota)